Dil Pe Mat Le Yaar!! is a 2000 Indian comedy-drama film directed by Hansal Mehta, written by Saurabh Shukla and produced by Ajay Tuli, Anish and Hansal Mehta. It stars Manoj Bajpayee, Tabu, Saurabh Shukla and Aditya Srivastava in pivotal roles. The film met with positive critical response and was an average grosser at the box office.

Plot
An innocent simpleton Ram Saran Pandey (Manoj Bajpai) leaves his village for Mumbai to make his earnings. He leaves behind his parents and promises them that he will call them to the city once he is stable. In the bustling city, he gets a job as a car mechanic. Kamya Lal (Tabu), a journalist, visits the car garage as a customer and is bowled over by his innocence and honesty. She makes up her mind to write articles on his life and make him popular among the social circles. Soon, the mutual admiration develops into a good friendship and Ram falls in love with her. However, she rebuffs him on every proposal.

On one night, Ram accidentally spots Kamya in a compromising position with another person in her apartment and this breaks his heart. He decides to shed his innocence, takes the rough path to propose her, and ends up being a don in town.

Cast
 Manoj Bajpayee as Ram Saran Pandey
 Tabu as Kamya Lal
 Aditya Srivastava as Tito
 Saurabh Shukla as Gaitonde
 Divya Jagdale as Gayatri
 Kishor Kadam as Bhaskar Shetty
 Vijay Raaz as Raju Bhai
 Harsh Chhaya as Ali
 Prithvi Zutshi as Suleman Patil
Gajraj Rao as Tiwariji
 Anupam Shyam
 Rakesh Kumar
 Kashmera Shah as a item song dancer

Soundtrack
The music is composed by Vishal Bhardwaj. Lyrics were written by Abbas Tyrewala except the song "Paagal" which was written by Piyush Mishra.

Critical response
Taran Adarsh of IndiaFM gave the film 1.5 out of 5, writing "On the whole, DIL PE MAT LE YAAR is a semi-art, semi-commercial film that will appeal to a select few in Mumbai, but those looking for 'masala' will be thoroughly disappointed. Businesswise, the film might fare well at select theatres of Mumbai city, but beyond the boundaries of the city, it will find itself in troubled waters. Having been released with several big projects will also tell on its business."

References

External links

2000s Hindi-language films
2000 films
Indian crime drama films
Films shot in Mumbai
Films scored by Vishal Bhardwaj
2000 directorial debut films